The 2014 Western Canada Cup was played at Credit Union Place in Dauphin, Manitoba from April 26 to May 4, 2014. The Yorkton Terriers and host Dauphin Kings finished first and second, respectively, to each earn a berth in the 2014 Royal Bank Cup.

Round robin

Tie Breaker: Head-to-Head, then 3-way +/-.

Results 

Schedule and results can be found on the official website.

Semi and Finals

See also
Western Canada Cup
2014 Royal Bank Cup

References

External links
Official Website

Western Canada Cup
Sport in Dauphin, Manitoba
Western Canada Cup
Western Canada Cup 2014
Western Canada Cup 2014
April 2014 sports events in Canada
May 2014 sports events in Canada